The Yesha Council (Mo'etzet Yesha, which is the Hebrew acronym for Yehuda Shomron, Aza, lit. "Judea Samaria and Gaza Council") is an umbrella organization of municipal councils of Jewish settlements in the West Bank (and formerly in the Gaza Strip), known by the Hebrew acronym Yesha.

The Chairman of the Yesha Council is Shlomo Ne’eman who was elected in 2022. The CEO of the Yesha Council is Shira Libman, appointed in 2022.

History
The council was founded in the 1970s as the successor to Gush Emunim ("Bloc of the Faithful"), an organization formed to promote Jewish settlement in the West Bank and Gaza Strip, which they regarded as the return of Jews to their Biblical homeland. The Council consists of 24 democratically elected mayors and ten community leaders, representing municipalities with a combined population of around half a million. Its resettlement policy was criticised by the Sason Report. Its mandate is to assist Jewish settlements in every possible way. The council works to improve security by, for instance, arranging the acquisition of bullet-proof ambulances and buses. The council works with the Israeli government to provide roads, electricity, and water to the settlements.

In addition to municipal and security issues, the Council serves as the political arm of the Jewish residents of Yesha. The Council lobbies for their interests with the Knesset and the government. The Council carries on public relations campaigns for the settlements and has organized several large public protests.

Activism

Protest Campaign 
In 2005 the Council led the protest campaign against the disengagement plan with peaceful mass protests: the human chain of 130,000, the Kfar Maimon march of 50,000, the Kotel rally of 70,000, and the Tel Aviv rally of 200,000. The council was praised by centrists for refraining from the use of violence—although some right-wing activists did resort to violence. It was also criticized by the right for failing to prevent the disengagement.

Rejection of violence
The council chairman Dani Dayan said that settlers must not use violence to advance their means. He said that such actions were "morally bankrupt" and only serve to "hinder the settlers' struggle."

Wikipedia editing course

On 3 August 2010, it was reported that the Yesha Council together with My Israel, a network of online pro-Israel activists committed to spreading Zionism online, were organizing people at a workshop in Jerusalem to teach them how to edit Wikipedia articles in a pro-Israeli way. Around 50 people took part in the course.

"We don't want to change Wikipedia or turn it into a propaganda arm," commented Naftali Bennett, director of the Yesha Council. "We just want to show the other side. People think that Israelis are mean, evil people who only want to hurt Arabs all day."  "The idea is not to make Wikipedia rightist but for it to include our point of view," he said in another interview.

The project organiser, Ayelet Shaked was interviewed on Arutz Sheva Radio. She emphasized that the information has to be reliable and meet Wikipedia rules. She cited some examples such as the use of the term "occupation" in Wikipedia entries, as well as in the editing of entries that link Israel with Judea and Samaria and Jewish history.

A course participant explained that the course is not a "Zionist conspiracy to take over Wikipedia"; rather, it is an attempt to balance information about disputed issues presented in the online encyclopedia. [T]he goal of this workshop was to train a number of pro-Israelis how to edit Wikipedia so that more people could present the Israeli side of things, and thus the content would be more balanced... Wikipedia is meant to be a fair and balanced source, and it is that way by having people from all across the spectrum contributing to the content. Another participant was not positive about the publication of the initiative, warning that going public in past occasions has had a bad effect, and recommending that the initiative would be better taken underground.

Following the course announcement, the head of Palestinian Journalists Syndicate said there were plans to set up a counter group to ensure the Palestinian view is presented online as the "next regional war will be [a] media war."

In 2011, Wikipedia co-founder Jimmy Wales stated in retrospect about the course organized by Israel Sheli, "we saw absolutely no impact from that effort whatsoever. I don't think it ever – it was in the press but we never saw any impact." Wales, who himself is a supporter of Israel, insists on neutrality when editing articles related to Israel and the Israeli-Palestinian conflict. At a speech at Tel Aviv University when accepting his Dan David Prize in May 2015, Wales insisted to avoid conflicts of interest is to provide as many facts as possible while maintaining neutrality, aiming to overwhelm any chance of bias and imbuing political ideology. Wales also stated that editors have to present what all sides have said and ultimately leave it to the reader to make their own judgments and have their own opinions regarding the conflict.

Heads of the Yesha Council

See also
 Israeli Civil Administration
 Israeli settlement
 Judea and Samaria Area
 Population statistics for Israeli West Bank settlements

References

External links
 

Israeli settlement
Political organizations based in Israel
Zionist organizations